Mainz-Laubenheim station is a railway station in the municipality of Mainz, Rhineland-Palatinate, Germany.

References

Laubenheim
Buildings and structures in Mainz